Dungri railway station is a small railway station on the Western Railway network in the state of Gujarat, India. Dungri railway station is 9 km far away from Valsad railway station. Mostly, Passenger and MEMU trains halt at Dungri railway station, but 19033/34 Valsad–Ahmedabad Gujarat Queen Express is only express train which halts here in both direction.

See also
 Valsad district

References

Railway stations in Valsad district
Mumbai WR railway division